The Arctomiaceae are a family of lichenized fungi in the Ascomycota, class Baeomycetales. The family was named by Theodor Magnus Fries in 1861, with Arctomia as the type genus. Species in this family are found in arctic and subarctic habitats, usually associated with bryophytes.

Classification
The order Arctomiales was proposed by Soili Stenroos, Jolanta Miadlikowska, and François Lutzoni in 2014 to contain this family. In 2018, the class Lecanoromycetes was revised using a temporal approach that uses time-calibrated chronograms to define temporal bands for comparable ranks for orders and families. In this work, the orders Arctomiales, Hymeneliales, and Trapeliales were synonymized with Baeomycetales. In a subsequent review of the use of this method for biological classification of lichens, Robert Lücking considered this merge justified. This synonymy was also accepted in later compilations of fungal classification, and Arctomiaceae is classified in the order Baeomycetales.

Genera
Arctomia  – 4 spp.
Gabura  – 3 spp.
Gregorella  – 1 sp.
Steinera  – 12 spp.
Wawea  – 1 sp.

Genus Gabura was resurrected for use in 2020 and contains three species formerly placed in Arctomia.

References

Baeomycetales
Lichen families
Lecanoromycetes families
Taxa described in 1861
Taxa named by Theodor Magnus Fries